Kunpimook Bhuwakul (born May 2, 1997), nicknamed BamBam, is a Thai rapper and singer  based in South Korea, and a member of the boy band Got7.

Biography
His name is derived from Bamm-Bamm Rubble of The Flintstones. His family consists of his mother and three siblings. His father died when he was 3 years old.

BamBam got interested in Korean culture and started dreaming of becoming a singer because of his mother, who, as a fan of Rain, brought him to several concerts. Inspired by him, he started learning to dance and sing when he was 10, and was part of the dance crew We Zaa Cool with Lisa of Blackpink. He won the first prize in Thailand Rain Cover Dance Competition in 2007, and placed second in Thailand LG Entertainer Competition in 2010. When he was 13, he passed JYP World Tour Audition in Thailand, and moved to South Korea to become a trainee.

On April 9, 2018, BamBam returned to Thailand for the military draft, and was exempted from serving due to the combined volunteer and red card recruit quota being reached in his region.

He attended Saiaksorn Elementary School and Pramoch Witthaya Raminthra High School, from which he graduated in January 2020.

Career

2014–2020: Debut and solo activities
He trained under JYP Entertainment for about three and a half years before his debut in Got7. His first pre-debut appearance was on an episode of Mnet's reality-survival program WIN: Who Is Next, which aired on September 6, 2013. BamBam alongside Mark Tuan, Jackson Wang, Yugyeom of Got7 and Young K, Jae Park, Wonpil, Sungjin, Junhyeok of Day6 were competing against the YG Entertainment trainees, Team A and Team B, that later debuted as Winner and iKon respectively.

Got7's debut song "Girls Girls Girls" and the music video for the track were released on January 16, 2014.

In 2016, BamBam and Jackson appeared on the South Korean variety show Real Men for a special episode with the theme of "Enlisting Together". BamBam and Jinyoung were made permanent hosts for Mnet's M Countdown alongside Key of Shinee from March 2015 to March 2016.

In 2017, BamBam produced the lyric video for Got7's song "You Are" from the group's seventh mini-album 7 for 7. On April 7, 2017, he released the single "Make It Right" for Yamaha Thailand's motorcycle qbix. He collaborated with Thai artists Jayjay Kritsanapoom, Best Nathasit, Mild Wiraporn, Captain Chonlathorn, and Ud Awat.

On September 28, 2018, he shared a self-directed, self-edited video titled "My Year 2018" on Got7's official YouTube account to thank fans for their support. On January 30, 2019, BamBam announced his first fan meeting tour "Black Feather in Thailand", which took place from March 2 to 17 across five cities, namely Bangkok, Nakhon Ratchasima, Khon Kaen, Phuket City and Chiang Mai.

In the spring of 2019, he joined Jus2 in their 'Focus' Premiere Showcase in Asia, acting as the MC for Jakarta (April 21) and Bangkok (April 27–28) stops.

On September 23, 2019, he published a self-filmed, directed and edited video titled "Feel It, See It" on Got7's official YouTube account, which features moments from the group's tour in America. On October 15, 2019, Thai rapper F. Hero released his album Into the New Era featuring a collaboration with BamBam titled "Do You".

In 2020, he sang his first OST, "I'm Not a Con-Heartist" (พี่ไม่หล่อลวง), for Thai movie The Con-Heartist. The song was released on November 16, and BamBam composed and produced it alongside Psycho Tension.

2021–present: Departure from JYPE, Ribbon and B 

On January 19, 2021, following the expiration of his contract, he left JYP Entertainment. On March 5, 2021, Abyss Company announced that BamBam had signed an exclusive contract with them. On March 16, he received the Inspirational Role Model for Youth Award at Thailand Master Youth 2020-2021 Awards. On May 17, he acted as MC for the Thai version of Simply K-Pop Con-Tour.

On June 15, 2021, he made his solo debut in South Korea with his first extended play, Ribbon, and its title track of the same name. He performed at SBS 2021 Super Concert in Daegu on October 31, and at 2021 K-Expo on November 6.

On December 28, 2021, BamBam released a new digital single, "Who Are You", featuring Seulgi from Red Velvet, which served as a pre-release for his new album. On January 1 and 2, 2022, he held his first fan meeting in Bangkok after two years. On January 7, he officially announced the release date of his second extended play, B, set for January 18. Its lead single, "Slow Mo", was released on the same day, accompanied by a "dreamlike" music video.

On April 22, 2022, BamBam released a new digital single, "Wheels Up", featuring Mayzin, under the newly established music company, Golden State Entertainment. From May 27 to May 29, he acted as MC for Mark Tuan's solo fan meeting in Thailand.

In February 2023, Abyss Company released a teaser for BamBam and confirmed their comeback on March 28.

Public image 
BamBam is considered to have a great influence in both the advertising and social media fields in Thailand. Since 2017, he has endorsed eight brands in his home country, from telecommunications companies, smartphones, and e-commerce to food, clothing, and motorcycles. His account on Twitter was Thailand's most mentioned entertainment account in 2019.

Other ventures

Fashion
On December 5, 2017, he launched his first clothing line, titled doubleB, in collaboration with Represent. The limited edition design was available for purchase for two weeks and the proceeds of the campaign, which sold 13,707 items, were devolved to Water.org, a non-profit organization that provides access to safe drinking water.

On September 7, 2021, he launched a second clothing line in collaboration with Charm's. The sales period, slated to end on September 30, was extended until October 10 due to high demands. A portion of the proceeds was donated to support low-income children.

In 2021, Vogue Thailand selected BamBam as one of the 100 influencers in the fashion industry in Thailand. On June 2, he was announced as YSL new beauty muse.

Philanthropy
In May 2019, he became the spokesman of a campaign launched by UNICEF Thailand and the Ministry of Social Development and Human Security against children abuse, and in September, he donated 100,000 baht to help children affected by the flood in Ubon Ratchathani province.

In 2020, he continued his partnership with UNICEF Thailand, taking part in its virtual concert Love Delivery Fest on May 31 to raise awareness and support for families affected by the COVID-19 pandemic, and the campaign "The Sound of Happiness" in collaboration with the Department of Mental Health and Joox Thailand, aimed at teens.

Endorsements
In 2020, BamBam was selected as the face of the new 5G campaign by AIS, the major mobile network operator in Thailand, along with Blackpink's Lisa. On November 10, he became the new ambassador for the life simulation videogame The Sims 4. On December 14, he released a new song, "Beat Your Best", to promote BK drinks. On 8 January 2022, BamBam was selected as global ambassador for the NBA's Golden State Warriors. On April 7, he debuted his new song, "Wheels Up," featuring Oakland-based rapper Mayzin, during halftime of the Warriors' home game against the Los Angeles Lakers at Chase Center in San Francisco. He also partered with Golden State, New Style Media Group and Fanatics on limited-edition T-shirts, sweatshirts and other merchandise.

Discography

Studio albums

Extended plays

Singles

Writing credits 
All song credits are adapted from the Korea Music Copyright Association's database, unless otherwise noted.

Filmography

Films

TV series

Television shows

Hosting

Music videos

Awards and nominations

Notes

References

External links

 
 
 

1997 births
Living people
Got7 members
Japanese-language singers of Thailand
English-language singers from Thailand
K-pop singers
Korean-language singers of Thailand
Thai rappers
Thai expatriates in South Korea
Thai singer-songwriters
Musicians from Bangkok
Thai people of Chinese descent